Hatzenbühl is a municipality in the district of Germersheim, in Rhineland-Palatinate, Germany.

Timbered houses in Hatzenbühl

References

Germersheim (district)